The men's 10,000 metres event at the 1978 Commonwealth Games was held on 6 August at the Commonwealth Stadium in Edmonton, Alberta, Canada.

Results

References

Final results (The Canberra Times)

Athletics at the 1978 Commonwealth Games
1978